Berenguer de Cruïlles (Peratallada, 1310 – Barcelona, 1362) was bishop of Girona, (Catalonia), (1349–1362) and first President of the Generalitat de Catalunya (1359–1362) in the 14th century, nominated by the  in 1359.

De Cruïlles was born around 1310 in Peratallada, a town in eastern Catalonia, and died in Barcelona in 1362. He was a member of the clergy at the See of Girona in 1321, canon in 1330, precentor in 1336, abbot of Sant Feliu in 1342, and was finally appointed bishop by Pope Clement VI. He was a fervent supporter of the excommunication of Ramon Berenguer I, Count of Empúries, uncle of the king. In 1357, he gave financial aid for the completion of the gold and wrought silver altarpiece for the cathedral, begun by his predecessor, bishop Gilabert de Cruïlles (1334–35). He was a pioneer inquisitor and a persecutor of heretics.

References

Further reading 
Història de la Generalitat de Catalunya i els seus Presidents. Barcelona: Enciclopèdia Catalana, 2003.

External links
 Enciclopèdia Catalana 

1310 births
1362 deaths
Presidents of the Government of Catalonia
Bishops from Catalonia
Bishops of Girona
14th-century Roman Catholic bishops in the Kingdom of Aragon